Maksim Maksimovich Nenakhov (born 13 December 1998) is a Russian football player who plays as a right back for FC Lokomotiv Moscow.

Club career
He made his debut in the Russian Professional Football League for FC Dynamo-2 Moscow on 20 July 2016 in a game against FC Tekstilshchik Ivanovo.

On 19 January 2018, he was loaned to FC Tyumen until the end of the 2017–18 season. He made his Russian Football National League debut for Tyumen on 4 March 2018 in a game against FC Olimpiyets Nizhny Novgorod. On 14 June 2018, he moved on another loan for the 2018–19 season to FC SKA-Khabarovsk.

On 18 June 2019, he signed a 2-year contract with FC Rotor Volgograd.

On 15 January 2020, Rotor announces his transfer to Russian Premier League club FC Akhmat Grozny.

On 3 June 2021, he signed a 3-year contract with FC Lokomotiv Moscow.

Career statistics

References

External links
 
 Profile by Russian Professional Football League

1998 births
People from Krasnogorsk, Moscow Oblast
Sportspeople from Moscow Oblast
Living people
Russian footballers
Russia youth international footballers
Russia under-21 international footballers
Association football defenders
FC Dynamo Moscow reserves players
FC Tyumen players
FC SKA-Khabarovsk players
FC Rotor Volgograd players
FC Akhmat Grozny players
FC Lokomotiv Moscow players
Russian Premier League players
Russian First League players
Russian Second League players